The Shot Tower located in Dubuque, Iowa, is one of the last remaining shot towers in the United States. It is listed on the National Register of Historic Places and remains a recognized symbol of the city. At its location near the Mississippi River, the Tower can be seen from the riverwalk and is currently undergoing extensive renovations.

History

The tower was built in 1856 to provide lead shot. The invention of the shot tower enabled economical production of many nearly perfect lead spheres of the right size to fit in a shot gun. To make the shot, molten lead was poured through a grate at the top of the tower. The droplets that fell from the grate were of relatively uniform size, and the fall provided enough time for the liquid-metal droplet to form into a sphere before landing in the water below. The water cooled the lead to its solid state, retaining the spherical shape.

The shot tower struggled almost immediately due to economic downturn from the Panic of 1857. A St. Louis company, Chadbourne & Co., purchased the Dubuque tower, but did not use it. After the war, the Standard Lumber Company used it as a fire watchtower.

The tower was abandoned after a series of fires in 1911 destroyed the local lumber industry and damaged the tower's wooden interior.  The fire was determined to be arson, but no one was ever arrested. In 1976, the tower was listed in the National Register of Historic Places. Tuckpointing and repairs soon followed, and in 2004, the Shot Tower became part of ongoing riverfront renovations.

References

External links 

Listing, drawing, and photographs, Survey number HABS IA-30-8 at the Historic American Buildings Survey (Library of Congress)
History of early drop towers

Towers completed in 1856
Industrial buildings completed in 1856
Towers in Iowa
National Register of Historic Places in Dubuque, Iowa
Industrial buildings and structures on the National Register of Historic Places in Iowa
Buildings and structures in Dubuque, Iowa
Shot towers
1856 establishments in Iowa